Halstead is a town and civil parish in the Braintree District of Essex, England. Its population of 11,906 in 2011 was estimated to be 12,161 in 2019. The town lies near Colchester and Sudbury, in the Colne Valley. It developed initially on the hill to the north of the river. The name Halstead is said to derive from the Old English hald (refuge, shelter, healthy) and stede (site, place or farm), meaning "healthy farm" or "place of refuge".

Area

The wide High Street is dominated by the 14th-century Church of St Andrew, which was extensively renovated in the Victorian period, but retains much older decoration, including tomb monuments from the 14th century and earlier.

The historic core of Halstead can be viewed on a walk up the market hill. There is a river walk running through the town from east to west. Just outside the town is Broaks Wood, a popular area for walking owned by the Forestry Commission. Halstead Public Gardens were established in 1900 and are noted for their floral displays. The Antiques Centre sells goods ranging from clothing to household items.

Mills
Townsford Mill spans the river at the bottom of the town houses. In 1818, Samuel Courtauld built two mills, Townsford at Halstead and another at Bocking. At the end of 1824, Halstead Mill was sold to Stephen Beuzeville. In 1825, Samuel installed a steam engine at Bocking Mill. An agreement dated 19 January 1825 was drawn up between Beuzeville and Samuel Courtauld and partners for the conversion of Halstead Mill for silk throwing. 

Beuzeville was to provide the expertise, capital and silk; Courtauld was to erect the power looms and operate the mill in return for a share in the profits; Beuzeville was to take delivery of the yarn and manufacture the crêpe, on which he was a technical expert with 20 years' experience. The mill appears to have been in operation by the summer of 1825, with Joseph Ash as manager.

The introduction of new technology was important, but the mills remained heavily dependent on labour. The looms required supervision by an army of young female workers. Even in 1838, more than 92 per cent of the workforce was female.

In 1827 Stephen Beuzeville was declared bankrupt; a formal deed of sale dated 11 April 1828 was created between the commissioners in bankruptcy and Samuel Courtauld, whereby Halstead Mill (subject to charges of £300) was sold to Courtaulds for a cash payment of £1,500. Stephen and his father joined Courtaulds as employees.

Amenities
Halstead has a library in a large open-plan building, built in 1864–1866 as the corn exchange. It has also housed a technical school. Nearby Moyns Park, a Grade I listed Elizabethan country house, is where Ian Fleming put the finishing touches to his novel From Russia, with Love, according to the cover text of some recent editions.

The town history society holds regular monthly meetings. There is a town museum attached to the town council offices featuring historical artefacts and objects of local interest. The Empire Theatre in Butler Road hosts occasional bingo nights. Halstead is home to Hume's Bakery, which opened in 1960 in the shop where it trades today.

The Jubilee Drinking Fountain was designed by the architect and architectural designer, Leonard Shuffrey. The stone drinking fountain was presented to the town by George Courtauld, and commemorates the Golden Jubilee of Queen Victoria.

Notable people
In birth order:

Robert Bourchier, 1st Baron Bourchier (died 1349), Lord Chancellor of England, had an estate here.
John Bourchier, 2nd Baron Bourchier (died 1400), soldier and diplomat, inherited the estate here.
Bartholomew Bourchier, 3rd Baron Bourchier (died 1409), politician, died at his estate here.
Bernard Barton (1784–1849), Quaker poet, was apprenticed to a shopkeeper and married here.
Dummy, the Witch of Sible Hedingham (c. 1788 – September 4, 1863), a deaf-mute charged with witchcraft, was beaten by a mob and died in Halstead workhouse.
Samuel Courtauld (1793–1881), opened a textile mill here in 1818.
George Courtauld (1802–1861), textile magnate, was married here in 1829.
Isaac Baker Brown (1811–1873), notable gynaecologist and obstetrician, went to school here.
Augustine Stow (1833–1903), Australian politician, was born here.
Decimus Alfred Ball (1836–1890), notable slum landlord in London, was born here.
Sir John Mark Davies (1840–1919), Australian politician, was born here.
Samuel Courtauld (1876–1947), art collector and industrialist, became a director of the silk mill here in 1901.
Gwen Ffrangcon-Davies (1891–1992), London-born actress, died here.
Alan Sainsbury, Baron Sainsbury (1902–1998), grandson of the founder of the Sainsbury's supermarket chain, was a resident and died here.
Steve Lamacq (born 1964), BBC Radio 6 Music DJ, grew up here, attended Ramsey School, and is a resident.
Matt Cardle (born 1983),  2010 winner of The X Factor, is a resident.

Schools
Halstead's three primary schools are Holy Trinity, St Andrew's and Richard de Clare. Its one secondary school is The Ramsey Academy (formerly Ramsey Secondary School), located to the north of the town centre. There are several other secondary schools within travelling distance; pupils commonly opt for Sible Hedingham, Braintree or Colchester. the independent Yellow House School at Sible Hedingham is an independent school for pupils with special needs. The two nearest further education colleges are at Braintree and the University of Essex at Colchester Campus.

Places of worship
The Anglican parish church is St Andrew's in Parsonage St. Holy Trinity Church, Halstead was declared redundant in April 1987 and is preserved by the Churches Conservation Trust.

Halstead also has a Methodist church, which opened as a Primitive Methodist chapel in 1874. Halstead Baptist Church is in Hedingham Road and Grace Baptist Church in Colchester Road, as is the Catholic Church of St Francis of Assisi. The United Reformed Church of Halstead is in Kings Road.

Sport
Halstead's main football club is Halstead Town F.C. It plays in the 9th tier of the English football league system, in the Essex senior league Premier Division.

The town is home to Halstead Cricket Club, which fields three teams in the Marshall Hatchick Two Counties Championship. For the 2011 season the club, with the help of club member and former Bangladesh bowling coach Ian Pont brought in Bangladeshi international cricketer Syed Rasel. Other players to have played both first-class cricket and for the club include former Essex and Leicestershire batsman Darren Robinson, international coach Richard Pybus and New Zealand double World Cup finalist Matt Henry.

Since 2010 the town has a rugby club, Halstead Templars R.F.C.

In 1921 the Courtauld Halstead Bowls Club was established at Courtauld Sports Ground. It marked its 100 years of Lawn Bowls in 2021, organising centenary matches with the England team, Essex team, North West Essex Bowling Association and several others. It competes annually in the North West Essex Bowling Association league, Sudbury Triples League, North Essex County Bowls Federation. Players compete in various Essex County competitions. The club has over 100 members and welcomes new ones.

Civil parish
On 31 December 1894 the parish was abolished and split to form "Halstead Rural" and "Halstead Urban". On 1 April 1974 Halstead Urban parish was renamed "Halstead" and Halstead Rural Greenstead Green and Halstead Rural.

Arms

References

External links

Halstead Then and Now in Old & Current Photography
Halstead and District Local History Society Website

 
Towns in Essex
Civil parishes in Essex
Braintree District